The South Indian state of Kerala has a coastline of around 590 km. The state is home to 1 major port, 7 intermediate ports and 12 minor ports.

Kochi Port, which is an all-weather natural harbour, is the major port present in Kerala. It is one of the largest commercial ports in India and the closest to international shipping routes(as well as safest for ships to dock). Kochi is an important hub of maritime commerce in India with a string of facilities like a container transshipment terminal(the only Indian port with this facility), shipyard for ship manufacturing and maintenance(largest in India), LNG terminal, oil terminal of Kochi Refineries, marina for yacht-totters(only facility in India).

Beypore Port handles most of the non-major port traffic in the state. It has both cargo and passenger services.

Neendakara Harbour is the biggest harbour in the Asian continent.

References

External links
Kerala ports

Ports and harbours of Kerala
ports and harbours